Young Hickory is an unincorporated community in Muskingum County, in the U.S. state of Ohio.

History
A former variant name of Young Hickory was Meigsville. Meigsville was laid out in 1840. A post office called Young Hickory was established in 1846, and remained in operation until 1902.

References

Unincorporated communities in Muskingum County, Ohio
1840 establishments in Ohio
Populated places established in 1840
Unincorporated communities in Ohio